Toulouse School of Management (formerly known as IAE Toulouse or Institut d’administrations des entreprises de Toulouse) is a public management school, part of Toulouse 1 University Capitole in France. It is also a component of the IAE's network, bringing together 35 national management schools around France.

History

Toulouse School of Management was established in 1955, as part of Toulouse 1 University Capitole.
The focus of the school is to provide skills in Management and Business Administration to executives and students from various backgrounds (Engineering, Law, Humanities...)  and to offer advanced expertise to high potential professionals who are seeking executive responsibilities.

 1955: creation of the CAAE (Aptitude Certification of Business Administration - Certification d'Aptitude à l'Administration des Entreprises) and the first double major university programme (today known as the MAE Master)
 1973: IPA becomes IAE Toulouse
 1981: creation of the CPECF (Preparatory Certification in Finance and Accounting Studies - Certificat Préparatoire aux Etudes Comptables et Financières) and the DESC (Advanced Accounting Studies Degree - Diplôme d'Etudes Comptables Supérieures)
 1988: creation of the Comprehensive Studies Degree in Management Studies (DEA Sciences de Gestion)
 1989: creation of the Specialized Superior Studies Degree in Marketing (DESS Marketing)
 1990: creation of the Master of Management Scicences (Maîtrise de Sciences de Gestion)
 1994: creation of the Specialized Superior Studies Degree in Financial Engineering (DESS Ingénierie Financière)
 1999: creation of the Specialized Superior Studies Degree in Innovation Management (DESS Gestion de l'Innovation)
 2004: establishment of the Bachelor, Master, Doctorate system. Opening of 3 Bachelor programmes (Marketing, Accounting, Management) and 5 Master's programmes (Accounting, Finance, Strategy, Human Resource Management, and Management)
 2005: reception of the Qualicert Service Certification
 2006: establishment of the Doctoral School in Management Sciences
 2008: EPAS accreditation of the International Management Master's programme
 since 2008: instalment of the Management and Accounting degree and the Management and Accounting Superior degree
 2009: creation of the Research Centre in Management (now known as TSM Research, UMR 5303)
 since 2012: the Research Centre in Management becomes the 5th institution to join the CNRS research team alongside HEC Paris, Polytechnic School, Dauphine, and IAE Grenoble
 2017: IAE Toulouse becomes Toulouse School of Management (TSM)

Academics

TSM educates more than 3,000 students every year, 20% international, in the field of Business Administration and Management. Students may enroll in a Bachelors program directly after a obtaining a Baccalauréat, or the equivalent high school diploma for international students. Unlike the French Grandes écoles, public university education is open enrollment, tuition is often more affordable, and registration does not require attendance at a Classe préparatoire aux grandes écoles or prépa (post-high school preparatory school). As with all IAE management schools, Toulouse School of Management is a business school within a public university, Toulouse 1 Capitole University (founded in 1229). Degrees from French universities are recognized world-wide and awarded by the Ministry of National Education (France). English is the language of instruction for the Bachelors of Science in Global Management degree, and several of its Master's degrees, and a B1 or B2 level of English competency is usually required. In 2022, annual tuition for a Bachelors degree taught in English-only was: €262, for students from anywhere in the world.

Programs 
TSM offers Bachelor, Master, and Doctoral programmes in many academic, business administration and management subjects. Higher education degrees in France are organized into three levels thus facilitating international mobility: the Licence / Bachelor's, Master's, and Doctorate degrees. A Bachelor's degree requires the completion of 180 ECTS credits; a Master's, requires an additional 120 ECTS credits.

 Accounting, Management Control, and Auditing
 Economy and Management
 Finance
 Health
 Human Resources Management
 Insurance, Bank and Finance
 International Management
 Law and Management
 Management
 Management and Business Administration
 Management Control
 Management Control and Organisational Auditing
 Marketing
 Purchasing
 Quality
 Sport Management
 Strategy

PhD Degree

Doctorate Program in Management (with Toulouse Business School)

Research 

Toulouse School of Management is recognized as a centre of pedagagogical and scientific expertise in various academic subjects in business and management. The TSM Research Laboratory (TSM Research) is accredited by the French Ministry of Research and the French National Centre for Scientific Research (CNRS). Faculty and doctoral program students also make use of the major research laboratories offered by Toulouse Capitole University, with its expertise in Law, Economics, and Management, and with the Grande école Toulouse Business School (TBS). TSM and TBS jointly award a EFMD-Accredited Ph.D. in management, TSM faculty and students have access to the TBS Research Centre, and TBS research faculty serve on the TSM board of directors.

Directors 

1956-1978: Pierre Vigreux

1978-2001: Pierre Spitéri

2001-2010: Hervé Penan

2010-2015: Catherine Casamatta

Since 2015: Hervé Penan

References

External links
Toulouse School of Management
TSM Alumni
Toulouse 1 University Capitole

Toulouse
Postgraduate schools in France
Education in Toulouse
University of Toulouse
Educational institutions established in 1955
1955 establishments in France